Jhumri Telaiya (also spelled as Jhumri Tilaiya) is a city in the Koderma subdivision of the Koderma District of Jharkhand, India.

Etymology 

Jhumri is the name of the original village in the area, which is now located in the city. The word "Telaiya" is the Hindi language word for a small lake (the Tilaiya Dam reservoir). Jhumari is also said to be a local folk dance.

History 
Jhumri Telaiya was once a major mica mining center. While laying a railroad through Kodarma in the 1890s, the British first discovered vast mica deposits in the region. Mining activities started soon after and many mining houses were established. CH Private Ltd. of Chattu Ram Bhadani and Horil Ram Bhadani, Birdhichand Bansidhar of Late Shree Lal Khatuwala were some of the top firms which operated in the area.

Govind Prasad Ambashtha was a popular man in this area during 1960s to 1990s. The prosperous businessmen built huge mansions in Jhumri Telaiya. Until the late 1960s, Mercedes and Porsche cars, and thoroughbreds from Arabia used to be common in Jhumri Telaiya. The city once boasted of the highest number of phone connections and phone calls made in India. Most of the mica business, was moved to the government-owned corporations sometime in 1973-74 through a government venture called as Bihar Mica Syndicate which had mica mines in Sapahi, 40 km from Jhumri Telaiya. This government venture was renamed to Bihar State Mineral Development Corporation (BSMDC), which is now known as Jharkhand State Mineral Development Corporation. Most of the mica used to be exported to USSR, for space and military equipment. The first firm to export mica was Birdhichand Bansidhar and later they setup their office in Hong Kong, Taiwan, Singapore, Sri Lanka and other places. With the dissolution of the USSR and the discovery of a synthetic substitute for mica, the mining activity declined in the 1990s.

The city was earlier a part of the Hazaribagh district, and was transferred to the newly created Koderma district on 10 April 1994. Originally a part of the Bihar state, Jhumri Telaiya became the part of the newly formed Jharkhand state in 2000. On 8 December 2008, the Jhumri Telaiya municipality was declared as a minor urban area.

Association with Vividh Bharati 

Originally a little-known town, Jhumri Telaiya became famous in India in the 1950s owing to its connection with the radio channels Radio Ceylon and Vividh Bharati (a nationally broadcast radio service of the All India Radio). At a time when numerous television channels and FM radio stations were yet to come to India, the radio shows were a national phenomenon. The largest number of requests for film songs addressed to the channel came from Jhumri Telaiya.

The trend started in the early 1950s, when a mica businessman named Rameshwar Prasad Barnwal started mailing 20-25 song requests to Radio Ceylon daily. Regularly hearing Barnwal's name on the radio inspired the paan-shop owner Ganga Prasad Magadhiya and Electronics Shop Owner of Nandlal Sinha to similarly mail a large number of song requests. The growing fame of these three Jhumri Telaiya residents led to the emergence of a song-request fad among the people of the town. Young listeners from the town would compete among themselves to send out the most song requests in a day or month. The radio listeners thus became familiar with the town of Jhumri Telaiya. In the 1980s, a radio listeners' club was formed in the town. Subsequently, other towns also started competing with Jhumari Telaiya by sending out a large number of song requests. The fad declined as television gained popularity, and postal costs increased.

Because of a large number of song requests and the town's unusual name, many listeners of Vividh Bharti used to doubt its existence. Thus the "Jhumri Talaiya" came to be associated with any less-known or insignificant place. This reference is found in several Hindi movies and songs. For example, the movie Mounto (1975) features a song titled Mein Toh Jhumri Telaiyah Seh Aeyehi Hun ("I've come from Jhumri Talaiya"). in Sooryavansham film Amitabh Bachchan as a bus conductor issued ticket to Jhumari Talayia.

Geography

Location
Jhumri Telaiya is located in the Damodar River valley, North Chotanagpur Division. It is situated about eight kilometres from Koderma. Both the towns are closely linked.some day going to be one big urban zone in Jharkhand. The entire town is divided by the grand cord line of Eastern Railway, which passes through the middle of the town.

It is situated in the Damodar Valley. Alternative English transliterations of the town's name include Jhumri Tilaiya, Jhumari Talaiya, and Jhumari Tilaiya.

The Tilaiya Dam reservoir is located near the town. The dam was the first dam and hydro-electric power station constructed by the Damodar Valley Corporation across the Barakar River.

Places of interest near Jhumri Telaiya include Rajgir, Nalanda, Bodhgaya, Hazaribag Wildlife Sanctuary, Padma Palace, Sonbhandar Caves (rumored to have hidden Mauryan treasures), Dhwajadhari Hill, Satagawan Petro falls, the tomb of Sant Paramhans Baba at Domchanch, Makamaro Hills, Itkhori and Shaktipeeth Maa Chanchala Devi. There is a famous temple on a hillock named Chanchal Pahad (Pahad means hill in Hindi). It was known for hot springs in the past. Though the springs have dried now, the temple is still popular for Hindu rituals.

Administration 

Jhumri Telaiya is situated in the Koderma tehsil of the Koderma district. The PIN code of Jhumri Telaiya is 825409.

Transport

Koderma railway station in Jhumri Telaiya is on the Grand Chord railway line of East Central Railway connecting Calcutta and Delhi via Dhanbad. Through it, the town is well connected to several of the major Indian cities including Delhi, Kolkata, Mumbai, Ujjain, Ahmedabad, Indore, Harda, Bhopal, Lucknow, Varanasi, Ranchi and Bhubaneswar.
 
Three new railway lines are being laid from Koderma railway station in three different directions:
1.Koderma-Giridih 102 km long
2.Koderma-Hazaribagh 79 km long (eventually to Barkakana railway junction, 133 km from Koderma)[Functioning now]
3.Koderma-Telaiya (JHARKHAND)
The 35 km long railway line from Koderma to Nawadih towards Giridih has been commissioned in June 2013 and a passenger train has started running on this small section. This has made Koderma a railway junction.
The railway line to Hazaribagh has been laid. Train service was started from 31 January 2014. Train runs two times a day from Koderma railway station to Hazaribagh.

Buses, jeeps, and three-wheelers connect Jhumri Telaiya with nearby towns and villages. The town is accessible via the National highway 31, which is popularly known as Ranchi-Patna Road. It is located 23 km from the Grand Trunk Road.

The nearest airport is Ranchi (162 km), the capital of the Jharkhand state. Patna, the capital of Bihar state, is situated 175 km away from the town.

Industries

Although the mica mining activity has declined, Jhumri Telaiya still remains an important mica center in the Koderma-Hazaribagh Industrial Area, according to a 2008 IBEF report. Telaiya has become incubator for small scale industries because of its proximity to easy access to minerals, good road-rail connectivity and good power infrastructure (due to the Damodar Valley Corporation sub station).

The region is a Ranchi Industrial Area Development Authority (RIADA) industrial area, which has hand pump and mica powder manufacturing units. Telaiya has numerous sponge iron plants and mica units. The Telaiya Ultra Mega Power Project (UMPP) is an upcoming coal-based power in the Hazaribagh district, not far away from Jhumri Telaiya. The Koderma Thermal Power station at Banjhedih is another power plant in the area.

On the banking sector, many national and private banks are available including State Bank of India, Union Bank of India, Bank of Baroda, Bank of India, United Bank of India, Allahabad Bank, ICICI Bank, HDFC Bank etc. along with their ATMs.

Demographics
As per 2011 Census of India Jhumri Telaiya Nagar Parishad had a total population of 87,867, of which 45,903 were males and 41,963 females. Scheduled Castes numbered 4,601 and Scheduled Tribes numbered 197.

As of 2001 India census, Jhumri Telaiya had a population of 69,444. Males constitute 53% of the population and females 47%. Jhumri Teliya has an average literacy rate of 62%, higher than the national average of 59.5%: male literacy is 72%, and female literacy is 52%. In Jhumri Teliya, 16% of the population is under 6 years of age.
Khortha is the major language spoken in the town. Apart from this Hindi, Bhojpuri, Punjabi, Bengali, Marwari, and English are also spoken by people in this town.

Literacy
As per 2011 census the total number of literates in Jhumri Telaiya Nagar Parishad was 60,076, out of which 34,398 were males and 25,678 were females.

Education

There are over 25 schools in and around Jhumri Telaiya, including PVSS D.A V. Public School, Sainik School, Grizzly Vidyalaya and Saraswati Shishu Mandir.

The colleges in the town include:
 Basukala Private Industrial Training Institute
 Chatthuram Horilram Intermediate College
 Grizzly College of Education
 Jagannath Jain College (JJ College)
 Jharkhand Vidhi Mahavidyalaya
 Jhumri Telaiya Commerce College, Karma
 Ramgovind Group of Colleges
 Ramgovind Institute of Technology, the only B.Tech. engineering college in the town
 Ramgovind Polytechnic Institute, the only diploma engineering college in the town
 Ram Lakhan Singh Yadav College
 Government Polytechnic, Koderma

There are also industrial training institutes and other vocational training centres in the town.

References

External links
 Thumbnail pictures of the Jhumri Telaiya town and Telaiya damImages of Telaiya Dam
 Website of Jhumri Telaiya

Cities and towns in Koderma district